Shekarnab (also Romanized as Shekarnāb, Shakarnāb, and Shekar Nāb; also known as Shakarāb) is a village in Kuhpayeh-e Gharbi Rural District, in the Central District of Abyek County, Qazvin Province, Iran. At the 2006 census, its population was 446, in 126 families.  The village contains the mausoleum of Imamzadeh Ali, built by Darvish Nureddin in 1479.

References 

Populated places in Abyek County